A. africana may refer to:

 Acatochaeta africana, a picture-winged fly species
 Actophilornis africana, the African jacana, a bird species
 Afzelia africana, an African tree of the legume family
 Alloteuthis africana, the African squid, a squid species
 Ameles africana, a praying mantis species found in Algeria, Morocco, Corsica, Dalmatia, Sardinia, Sicily and Portugal 
 Ampelocissus africana, the Rogon daji or Lanbi, a woody vine or liana of the grape family
 Ansellia africana, the African ansellia or leopard orchid, an orchid species
 Aquila africana, the Cassin's hawk-eagle, a bird of prey species
 Aristea africana, a flowering plant species in the genus Aristea

Synonyms
 Anhinga africana, a synonym for Anhinga rufa, the African darter or snakebird, a water bird species of tropical sub-Saharan Africa

See also
 Africana (disambiguation)
 A. africanus (disambiguation)